Dermot Moran is an Irish philosopher specialising in phenomenology and in medieval philosophy, and he is also active in the dialogue between analytic and continental philosophy. He is currently the inaugural holder of the Joseph Chair in Catholic Philosophy at Boston College. He is a member of the Royal Irish Academy and a founding editor of the International Journal of Philosophical Studies.

Biography 
Dermot Moran was born in Stillorgan, Dublin, Ireland. He was educated at Oatlands College, primary and secondary schools where he specialised in the sciences, but was also active in debating in English and Irish. He was awarded the Higgins Gold Medal for Chemistry there in 1968, as well as the Institute of Chemists of Ireland Gold Medal for Chemistry in 1970. He is a published poet and was awarded the Irish Press New Irish Writing literary award for his poetry. Having studied mathematics, applied mathematics, physics and chemistry for the Leaving Certificate examination, he decided to study languages and literature in university.

He entered University College Dublin in 1970 on the basis of a UCD entrance scholarship and completed his BA in 1973, graduating with a double first class honours degree in English and philosophy. He was the recipient of Wilmarth Lewis Scholarship to Yale University for graduate study. He graduated from Yale University with MA (1974), MPhil (1976) and PhD (1986) degrees in philosophy. He then returned to Ireland to take up a post at Queen's University of Belfast. He taught at Queen's Belfast from 1979 to 1982, and then moved to a permanent lectureship in St Patrick's College Maynooth, then a Recognised College of the National University of Ireland.

In 1989, he was appointed to the chair of philosophy (metaphysics and logic) at University College Dublin. In 1992–1993, he was distinguished visiting professor at Connecticut College, and in fall 2003 and spring 2006 he was Lynette S. Autry Professor of Humanities at Rice University. In 2007 he was visiting professor at Northwestern University, Evanston, Illinois. He is a visiting professor in other institutions around the world, including Sorbonne, University at Albany, SUNY, Catholic University of Leuven, Trinity College Dublin, and Ludwig Maximilian University of Munich.

He has been an elected member of the Royal Irish Academy since March 2003, and has been involved in the Internationale des Sociétés de Philosophie, the highest non-governmental world organisation for philosophy, since the 1980s.

He is the Founding Editor of International Journal of Philosophical Studies, founded in 1993 and published by Routledge, and co-editor of Contributions To Phenomenology book series, published by Springer.

His monograph "Introduction to Phenomenology" was awarded the Edward Goodwin Ballard Prize in Phenomenology (2001) and was translated into Chinese. A Turkish translation of the book is in preparation. Moran served both as president of the programme committee for the 23rd World Congress of Philosophy which took place in Athens from 4–10 August 2013, and as president of the 24th World Congress of Philosophy which took place in Beijing from 13 to 20 August 2018.

In 2010 he was guest professor at the Chinese University of Hong Kong for the Edwin Cheng Foundation Summer School in Phenomenology.

Areas of specialization 
 Phenomenology (especially Husserl and Heidegger)
 Medieval philosophy (especially Christian Neoplatonism, John Scottus Eriugena, Nicholas of Cusa)
 Philosophy of mind and cognitive science (intentionality, consciousness, embodiment, empathy)
 Modern European philosophy (especially Descartes, Kant, German Idealism)
 Relations between analytic and continental philosophy
 History of twentieth-century philosophy

Areas of competence 
 Philosophy of mind (esp. Dennett, Searle, Putnam)
Metaphysics (Aristotle, Aquinas, Kant)
 Environmental ethics

Fellowships and awards 
Chief investigator, The Constitution of Personal Identity: Self-Consciousness, Agency, and Mutual Recognition [Dr. James Jardine], Irish Research Council Postdoctoral Fellow (2017–2018). (Value: €45,895.00).
 Chief investigator, The Political Philosophy of the Wartime Kyoto School and its Intellectual Potential: Tanabe Hajime, Miki Kiyoshi and Nishitani Keiji in Comparative Perspective [Dr Kenn Nakata Steffensen], Irish Research Council Elevate Extension award (2017–2018). Project ID: ELEVATEPD/2014/30. (Value: €60,309).
 Chief investigator, The Political Philosophy of the Wartime Kyoto School and its Intellectual Potential: Tanabe Hajime, Miki Kiyoshi and Nishitani Keiji in Comparative Perspective [Dr Kenn Nakata Steffensen], Irish Research Council Elevate Marie Curie award, 2014–2018. (Value: €60,309).
 Chief investigator, The Phenomenology of Self-Esteem [Dr Anna Bortolan], Irish Research Council postdoctoral fellowship, 2016–2018. (Value: €92,000).
 Chief investigator, Sensing the Other: Habit(us), Practical Reason and Empathy [Dr Elisa Magrì], Irish Research Council postdoctoral fellowship, 2016–2018. (Value: €92,000).
 Chief investigator, The Social Matrix: An Investigation of the Subjective Bases of Violence, Destructiveness and Ethical Failure [Dr Anya Daly], Irish Research Council postdoctoral fellowship, 2016–2018. (Value: €92,000).
 Chief investigator, Towards a Phenomenology of the Anxious Body [Dr Dylan Trigg], Marie Curie award (2014–2017), FP7-PEOPLE-2013-IOF 624968. (Value €263,058).
 Chief investigator, The Affective Ground of Philosophy in Heidegger (Dr. Christos Hadjioannou). Irish Research Council postdoctoral fellowship, 2016–2017. (Value: €45,895.00).
 Catechetics Trust Newman fellowship in the Philosophy of Religion (2014–2016), UCD. Empathic Subjectivity. Edith Stein on the Phenomenology of Empathy [Dr Elisa Magrì] (Value: €92,000).
 Chief investigator, IRC PhD Scholarsdhip., The Forms of Intersubjectivity in Scheler (2013–2017) [Cinzia Ruggeri]. (Value: €96,000.00).
 Principal investigator, UCD Seed Funding Career Development Award. Project title: SOCIUS: Exploring the Interpersonal World through Phenomenology, 2013–2015 (€10,883.00).
 Principal investigator, UCD Seed Funding Award. Project title: Empathy and Community: John Henry Newman and Edith Stein, 2013–2015. (Value: €1,227.00).
 Principal investigator, Irish Research Council of the Humanities and Social Sciences (IRCHSS) Advanced Collaborative Research Project Grant, 2012–2013. Project title: ‘Discovering the “We”: The Phenomenology of Sociality’. (Value: €119,099).
 Principal investigator, Irish Research Council of the Humanities and Social Sciences (IRCHSS) Project: Intersubjectivity, Power and Critique: Axel Honneth and the Project of Critical Theory, UCD 2012–2013 (value €39,378).
 Principal investigator, Irish Research Council of the Humanities and Social Sciences (IRCHSS) Project Merleau-Ponty and the Prehistory of the Subject, UCD 2012–2014 (value: €78,756).
 Principal investigator, Canadian Social Sciences and Humanities Research Council (SSHRC) Partnership Development Grant, ‘Discovering Canada's Contributions to the Origins of the International Phenomenological Movement in the Winthrop Bell Papers, 2012–2014 (Canadian Dollars $199,398.00).
 Australian Research Council (ARC) Discovery Project. Title: “Judgment, Responsibility and the life-world: The phenomenological critique of formalism”, 2010–2012 (Value: Aus$167,000).
 Irish Research Council of the Humanities and Social Sciences (IRCHSS) Research Development Initiative Grant, 2008–2011 (value: €99,600). Project title: „The Phenomenology of Consciousness and Subjectivity‟
 Australian Research Council (ARC) Discovery Project. Title: “Judgment, Responsibility and the life-world: The phenomenological critique of formalism”, 2010–2013 (value 167,000 Australian dollars)
 University College Dublin President's Sabbatical Fellowship 2003–2004
 Senior fellowship, Irish Research Council for the Humanities and Social Sciences (IRCHSS), Government of Ireland, 2002–2003
 Awarded Edward Goodwin Ballard Prize in Phenomenology (2001)
 University College Dublin, President's Fellowship 1996–1997
 DAAD Postdoctoral Award, Germany, 1989
 British Academy, travel grant
 Yale University postgraduate fellowships 1973–1978
 Yale Concilium for Area Studies Award, 1978
 Magennis Prize in Philosophy, University College Dublin 1973
 Gold Medal for Chemistry, Institute of Chemistry of Ireland, 1970
 University College Dublin, entrance scholarship 1970

Authored books 
 The Husserl Dictionary. Bloomsbury, 2012.
 Husserl's Crisis of the European Sciences and Transcendental Phenomenology: An Introduction. Cambridge University Press, 2012.
 Edmund Husserl: Founder of Phenomenology. Polity Press, 2005.
 Introduction to Phenomenology. London and New York: Routledge, 2000.
 The Philosophy of John Scottus Eriugena. A Study of Idealism in the Middle Ages. Cambridge: Cambridge University Press, 1989.
 Dermot Moran, (德穆‧莫倫), Xianxiangxue Daolun (現象學導論),[Introduction to Phenomenology] translated into Chinese by 蔡錚雲, Prof. Tsai, Cheng-Yun, National Sun Yat-Sen University, Taiwan (Taipei: Laureate Book Co. Ltd., 2005).
 德尔默·莫兰(Dermot Moran)： 《现象学一部历史的和批评的导论》[Introduction to Phenomenology], trans. Li Youzheng, 李幼蒸译，中国人民大学出版社，Beijing, Renmin University Press, 2017年7月
 Dermot Moran, Introduccíon a la Fenomenologicá. Presentación de Gustavo Leyva, Traducción de Francisco Castro Merrifield y Pablo Lazo Briones. Rubí, Barcelona: Editorial Anthropos/ Mexico: Universidad Autónoma Metropolitana, 2011.

Edited books 
 Edmund Husserl, Ideas: A General Introduction to Pure Phenomenology. Edited with a New Foreword by Dermot Moran. Routledge Classics, 2012.
 Phenomenology 2010, Volume 4: Traditions, Transitions and Challenges. Edited by Dermot Moran and Hans Rainer Sepp. Zeta Books, 2010.
 The Routledge Companion to Twentieth Century Philosophy. Edited by Dermot Moran. London and New York: Routledge, 2008.
 Epistemology. The Proceedings of the Twenty-First World Congress of Philosophy, held in Istanbul, Turkey in 2003, Volume 6. Ed. Dermot Moran and Stephen Voss. Ankara: Philosophical Society of Turkey, 2007. pp. vii +162.
 Eriugena, Berkeley, and the Idealist Tradition. Edited by Stephen Gersh and Dermot Moran. Notre Dame: University of Notre Dame Press, 2006.
 Phenomenology: Critical Concepts in Philosophy. 4 Vols. Edited by Lester Embree and Dermot Moran. Routledge Press, 2004.
 The Phenomenology Reader. Edited by Dermot Moran and Timothy Mooney. London and New York: Routledge, 2001.
 Edmund Husserl, Logical Investigations. Volume 1. Translated by J. N. Findlay. Edited and revised with a new Introduction by Dermot Moran and new Preface by Michael Dummett. London and New York: Routledge, 2001.
 Edmund Husserl, Logical Investigations. Volume 2. Translated by J. N. Findlay. Edited and revised with a new Introduction by Dermot Moran and new Preface by Michael Dummett. London and New York: Routledge, 2001.
 Edmund Husserl, The Shorter Logical Investigations. Translated by J. N. Findlay. Edited and abridged with a new Introduction by Dermot Moran and new Preface by Michael Dummett. London and New York: Routledge, 2001.

Articles in refereed journals 
 “Philosophy in China: Reflections on the 24th World Congress of Philosophy,” Frontiers of Philososphy in China vol. 13 no. 2 (2018), pp. 166–173. 
 “The Phenomenology of the Social World: Husserl on Mitsein as Ineinandersein and Füreinandersein,”. Metodo, Special Issue ed. Elisa Magrì and Danielle Petherbridge, vol. 5 no. 1 (2017), pp. 99–142.
 “Husserl and Ricoeur: The Influence of Phenomenology on the Formation of Ricoeur’s Hermeneutics of the ‘Capable Human’,” Journal of French and Francophone Philosophy - Revue de la philosophie française et de langue française, Vol XXV, No 1 (2017), pp. 182–199. 
 “Hegel and Phenomenology: Introduction,” [with Elisa Magrì], Special Issue, Hegel and Phenomenology, Hegel Bulletin vol. 38 no. 1 (May 2017), pp. 1–6. 
 (D. 莫兰), 一个论及‘无’的西方思想家：约翰.司各脱.爱留根那 ,  “A Western Thinker of Nothingness: John Scottus Eriugena,” translated into Chinese by 刘素民, Prof. Liu Sumin, 世界哲学， World Philosophy Vol. 6 (2016), pp. 52–57.
 “Cognitive Phenomenology and Conscious Thought: Issues, Views and Future Developments,” [with Marta Jorba], Special Issue on Cognitive Phenomenology, Philosophical Explorations vol. 19 no. 2 (2016), 95–113.
 “Reply to Professor Jaakko Hintikka’s Philosophical Research: Problems and Prospects,” Diogenes (Sage, 2016), 1–16. 
 “Husserl on Human Subjects as Sense-Givers and Sense-Apprehenders in a World of Significance,” Special Issue: Figures, Functions and Critics of Subjectivity beginning from Husserlian Phenomenology, ed. Emanuele Mariani. Discipline Filosofiche XXV no. 2 (2016), pp. 9–33. 
 “Sinnboden der Geschichte: Husserl’s Mature Reflections on the Structural A Priori of History,” Husserl and Foucault on the Historical A Priori in Husserl and Foucault Special Issue, Continental Philosophy Review, vol. 49 no. 1 (2016), pp. 13–27.
 “Editors’ Introduction: Resurrecting the Phenomenological Movement,” [with Rodney K. B. Parker], Special Issue on Early Phenomenology, Studia Phaenomenologica, vol. XV (2015), pp. 11–24.
 [with Thomas Szanto] ‘Introduction: Empathy and Collective Intentionality – The Social Philosophy of Edith Stein’, Special Issue on Empathy and Collective Intentionality: The Social Philosophy of Edith Stein. (Special Issue): Human Studies vol. 38 no. 4 (Dec. 2015), pp. 445–461.
 “Dissecting Mental Experiences: Husserl’s Phenomenological Reflections on the Erlebnis in Ideas/Diseccionando las experiencias mentales: Las reflexiones fenomenológicas de Husserl sobre Erlebnis en Ideas,” Investigaciones Fenomenológicas [Journal of the Spanish Society of Phenomenology] vol. Monográfico 5 (2015), pp. 13–35. 
 “Defending the Transcendental Attitude: Husserl’s Concept of the Person and the Challenges of Naturalism,” Phenomenology and Mind vol. 7 (2014), pp. 37–55. 
 “‘The Ego as Substrate of Habitualities’: Edmund Husserl's Phenomenology of the Habitual Self,” Phenomenology and Mind, vol. 6 (July 2014), pp. 27–47. 
 “What Does Heidegger Mean by the Transcendence of Dasein?” International Journal of Philosophical Studies Vol. 22 No. 4 (2014), pp. 491–514.
 “Reponse à Jaakko Hintikka,” Revue Diogène: An International Journal in the Humanities, Issue no. 242 (2013/2), pp. 27–48. 
 ‘“There is no Brute World, only an Elaborated World”: Merleau-Ponty on the Intersubjective Constitution of the World’, South African Journal of Philosophy, Volume 32 Issue 4 (December 2013), pp. 355–71.
 ‘“Die verborgene Einheit intentionaler Innerlichkeit”: Husserl on History, Life and Tradition’, Special Issue on La Vie, Revue de phénoménologie ALTER, no. 21 (2013), pp. 117–134.
 “Intentionality: Some Lessons from the History of the Problem from Brentano to the Present,” Special Issue on Intentionality, International Journal of Philosophical Studies Vol. 21 No. 3 (2013), pp. 317–358.
 “Jean Scot Érigène, la connaissance de soi et la tradition idéaliste, «  Les Études Philosophiques Janvier-1 2013 Jean Scot Érigène (Paris: PUF, 2013), pp. 29–56.
 “Science, Technology and Preservation of the Life-World,” The European Review, Academia Europæa, Vol. 21, No. 1 (2013) pp. 104–112.
 ‘“Let’s Look at It Objectively”: Why Phenomenology Cannot be Naturalized,’ Phenomenology and Naturalism, Philosophy Supplementary Volume 72 (April 2013), pp. 89–115.
 [with Rasmus Thybo Jensen], “Editors’ Introduction,” in Rasmus Thybo Jensen and Dermot Moran, eds, Special Issue, ‘Intersubjectivity and Empathy’, Phenomenology and the Cognitive Sciences Vol. 11 No. 2 (2012), pp. 125–133.
 ‘“Even the Papuan is a Man and Not a Beast”: Husserl on Universalism and the Relativity of Cultures,’ Journal of the History of Philosophy vol. 49 no. 4 (October 2011), pp. 463–94. 
 “Edmund Husserl’s Phenomenology of Habituality and Habitus,” Journal of the British Society for Phenomenology, Vol. 42 no. 1 (January 2011), pp. 53–77.
 “Sartre on Embodiment, Touch, and the ‘Double Sensation’,” Recenterings of Continental Philosophy vol. 35, Philosophy Today vol. 54 (Supplement 2010) pp. 135–41.
 "The Phenomenology of the Personhood: Edmund Husserl and Charles Taylor,” Colloquium Vol. 3 (2009), pp. 80–104.
 “Sartre on Embodiment, Touch, and the ‘Double Sensation’,” Proceedings of 48th Annual SPEP Meeting, Philosophy Today (Supplement 2010). In press.
 “Husserl's Transcendental Critique of Naturalism,” Continental Philosophy Review. Volume 41 No. 4 (December 2008), pp. 401–425.
 “Immanence, Self-Experience, and Transcendence in Edmund Husserl, Edith Stein and Karl Jaspers,” American Catholic Philosophical Quarterly vol. 82, no. 2 (Spring 2008), pp. 265–291.
 “Edmund Husserl’s Letter to Lucien Lévy-Bruhl, 11 March 1935: Introduction,” with the assistance of Lukas Steinacher, New Yearbook for Phenomenology and Phenomenological Philosophy, Vol. VIII (2008), pp. 325–347.
 “Hegel and the Neoplatonic Tradition,” Bulletin of the Hegel Society of Great Britain (2006). In preparation.
 “Fink’s Speculative Phenomenology: Between Constitution and Transcendence,” Research in Phenomenology, Vol. 37 No. 1 (2007), pp. 3–31.
 “Editorial,” International Journal of Philosophical Studies, Vol. 12 No. 1 (Feb. 2004), pp. 1–2.
 “El idealismo en la filosofía medieval: el caso de Juan Escoto Eriúgena,” trans. Raul Gutierrez, Areté. Revista de Filosofía Vol. XV No. 1 (Lima: Pontificia Universidad Católica del Perú, 2003), pp. 117–154.
 “Editorial,” International Journal of Philosophical Studies Vol. 9 no 1 (Feb. 2001), pp. 1– 2.
 “Editorial,” International Journal of Philosophical Studies Vol. 9 no 3 (Aug. 2001), pp. 289–90.
 “Husserl’s Critique of Brentano in the Logical Investigations,” Manuscrito, Special Husserl Issue, Vol. XXIII No. 2 (2000), pp. 163–205.
 “Kant and Putnam: Two ‘Internal Realists’?” Synthese Vol. 123 No. 1 (2000), pp. 65–104.
 “Heidegger’s Critique of Husserl’s and Brentano’s Accounts of Intentionality,” Inquiry Vol. 43 No. 1 (March 2000), pp. 39–65.
 “Our Germans are Better Than Their Germans”: Continental and Analytic Approaches to Intentionality Reconsidered,” Philosophical Topics Vol. 27 No. 2 (Fall 1999), pp. 77–106.
 “Idealism in Medieval Philosophy: The Case of Johannes Scottus Eriugena,” Medieval Philosophy and Theology Vol. 8 (1999), pp. 53–82.
 “The Inaugural Address: Brentano’s Thesis,” Inaugural Address to the Joint Session of the Aristotelian Society and the Mind Association, Proceedings of the Aristotelian Society Supplementary. Volume LXX (1996), pp. 1–27.
 “Pantheism in Eriugena and Nicholas of Cusa,” American Catholic Philosophical Quarterly (formerly New Scholasticism) Vol. LXIV No. 1 (Winter 1990), pp. 131–152.
 “Phenomenology and the Destruction of Reason,” Irish Philosophical Journal, Vol. 2, No. 1 (Belfast, 1985), pp. 15–36.
 “Chronique nationale de publications de philosophie médiévale 1977–83,” Bulletin de Philosophie Médiévale, 25 (1983), pp. 151–57. Co-authored with J.J. McEvoy.
 “Natura Quadriformata and the Beginnings of physiologia in the Philosophy of John Scottus Eriugena,” Bulletin de Philosophie Médiévale 21 (1979), pp. 41–46.

Book chapters 
 “Edmund Husserl,” in Sebastian Luft and Søren Overgaard, eds, The Routledge Companion to Phenomenology (London & New York: Routledge, 2011). In preparation.
 “Sartre’s Ontology of the Body,” in Vesselin Petrov, ed., Ontological Landscapes—Recent Thought on Conceptual Interfaces between Science and Philosophy (Frankfurt: Ontos-Verlag, 2010). In press.
 “Immanence, Self-Experience, and Transcendence in Edmund Husserl, Edith Stein and Karl Jaspers,” in Fran O’Rourke, ed.., Essays in Memory of Gerard Hanratty (Notre Dame: University of Notre Dame Press, 2010). In press.
 “Phenomenology and Deconstruction,” The Blackwell Guide to Heidegger's Being and Time, ed. Robert Scharff, Blackwell Guides to Great Works Series. Oxford: Blackwell, 2010. In press.
 “Choosing a Hero: Heidegger’s Conception of Authentic Life in Relation to Early Christianity,” in Andrzej Wiercinski and Sean McGrath, eds, A Companion to Heidegger's Phenomenology of Religious Life (Amsterdam: Rodopi, 2010). In proof.
 “Meister Eckhart and Modern Philosophy,” in Jeremiah Hackett, ed., A Companion to Meister Eckhart. Leiden: Brill, 2010, in press.
 “Johannes Scottus Eriugena,” in Encyclopedia of Medieval Philosophy: Philosophy Between 500 and 1500, ed. Henrik Lagerlund (Dordrecht: Springer, 2010).
 “The Secret Folds of Nature: Eriugena’s Expansive Concept of Nature (Physis),” Redefining Nature's Boundaries: Premodern and Postmodern Confluences. Ed. Alf Siewers. Proceedings of the ‘Redefining Nature’s Boundaries’ Lecture Series, Humanities Institute & Environmental Institute Colloquium, Bucknell University Press. In press, publication date 2010.
 “Husserl and Sartre on Embodiment and the ‘Double Sensation’,” in Katherine J. Morris, ed. Sartre on the Body, Philosophers in Depth Series. Basingstoke: Palgrave-Macmillan, 2010, pp. 41–66.
 “Continental Philosophies,” in Andrew Gardner, Mark Lake and Ulrike Sommer, eds, The Oxford Handbook of Archaeological Theory (Oxford: OUP, 2010). In preparation.
 “Brentano,” in William Schroeder and Simon Critchley, eds, The Blackwell Companion to Continental Philosophy, Second Edition (Oxford: Blackwell, 2010). In preparation.
 “Husserl and Heidegger on the Transcendental ‘Homelessness’ of Philosophy,” Phenomenology, Archaeology, Ethics: Current Investigations of Husserl’s Corpus, ed. Pol Vandevelde and Sebastian Luft, Issues in Phenomenology and Hermeneutics series (London & New York: Continuum Press, 2010), in press.
 “Describing the Life of Spirit: Husserl’s Engagement with Hegel,” in Joseph Cohen, ed., Two Hundred Years of Phenomenology of Spirit. 2009. In press.
 “Analytic and Continental Philosophy,” in Len Lawlor, ed., Responses to Phenomenology (1930–1967), Acumen History of Continental Philosophy, Volume 4. Chesham: Acumen, 2009. In press.
 “Towards and Assessment of Twentieth-Century Philosophy,” The Routledge Companion to Twentieth-Century Philosophy. Ed. Dermot Moran. London & New York: Routledge, 2008, pp. 1–40.
 “The Phenomenological Approach: An Introduction,” in Lucas Introna, Fernando Ilharco and Eric Fay, eds, Phenomenology, Organisation, and Technology.(Lisbon: Universidada Catolica Editora, 2008), pp. 21–41.
 “Nicholas of Cusa (1401–1464): Platonism at the Dawn of Modernity,” in Platonism at the Origins of Modernity: Studies on Platonism and Early Modern Philosophy, edited Douglas Hedley and Sarah Hutton, Proceedings of A Conference of the British Society for the History of Philosophy, in association with the Centre for Research in the Arts, Social Sciences and Humanities (CRASSH), Clare College Cambridge 27–29 March 2003, International Archives in the History of Ideas Volume 196. Dordrecht: Springer, 2007. Chapter two, pp. 9–29.
 “Cusanus and Modern Philosophy,” in James Hankins, ed., The Cambridge Companion to Renaissance Philosophy. Cambridge: CUP, 2007, pp. 173–192.
 “John Scottus Eriugena,” chapter in Graham Oppy and Nick Trakakis, eds, History of Western Philosophy of Religion. Chesham: Acumen Press, 2007., in press.
 ‘Heidegger’s Transcendental Phenomenology in the Light of Husserl’s Project of First Philosophy,’ in Steven Crowell and Jeff Malpas, eds, Transcendental Heidegger (Stanford: Stanford U. P., 2007), pp. 135–150 and pp. 261–264.
 ‘Beckett and Philosophy’, in Christopher Murray, ed., Samuel Beckett – One Hundred Years (Dublin: New Island Press, 2006), pp. 93–110.
 ‘Edmund Husserl’s Methodology of Concept Clarification,’ in Michael Beaney, ed., The Analytic Turn: Analysis in Early Analytic Philosophy and Phenomenology (London & New York: Routledge, 2007), pp. 239–261.
 “Eriugena, John Scottus,” Entry in A. C. Grayling, Andrew Pyle and Naomi Goulder, eds, Encyclopedia of British Philosophy (Bristol/London: Thoemmes Continuum, 2006).
 (with Stephen Gersh) “Introduction”, Stephen Gersh and Dermot Moran, eds, Eriugena, Berkeley and the Idealist Tradition (Notre Dame, Indiana: University of Notre Dame Press, 2006), pp. 1–13.
 “Spiritualis Incrassatio: Eriugena’s Intellectualist Immaterialism: Is It an Idealism?” in Stephen Gersh and Dermot Moran, eds, Eriugena, Berkeley and the Idealist Tradition (Notre Dame, Indiana: University of Notre Dame Press, 2006), pp. 123–150.
 “Eriugena, John Scottus,” Medieval Science, Technology, and Medicine: An Encyclopedia, ed. Thomas F. Glick, Steven J. Livesey, and Faith Wallis (London & New York: Routledge, 2005), pp. 161–64.
 “The Meaning of Phenomenology in Husserl’s Logical Investigations,” in Gary Banham, ed. Husserl and the Logic of Experience (London & New York: Palgrave Macmillan, 2005), pp. 8–37.
 ‘What is Historical in the History of Philosophy? Towards an Assessment of Twentieth-Century European Philosophy,’ in Peter Kemp, ed., History in Education. Proceedings from the Conference History in Education held at the Danish University of Education 24–25 March 2004. (Copenhagen: Danish University of Education Press, 2005), pp. 53–82.
 With L. Embree, ‘General Introduction,’ Phenomenology. Critical Concepts in Philosophy. Ed. Dermot Moran and Lester E. Embree. (London & New York: Routledge, 2004), Vol. 1, pp. 1–7.
 With L. Embree, ‘Introduction to Volume I,’ Phenomenology. Critical Concepts in Philosophy. Ed. Dermot Moran and Lester E. Embree. (London & New York: Routledge, 2004), Vol. 1, pp. 9–12.
 With L. Embree, ‘Introduction to Volume II,’ Phenomenology. Critical Concepts in Philosophy. Ed. Dermot Moran and Lester E. Embree. (London & New York: Routledge, 2004), Vol. 2, pp. 1–3.
 With L. Embree, ‘Introduction to Volume III,’ Phenomenology. Critical Concepts in Philosophy. Ed. Dermot Moran and Lester E. Embree. (London & New York: Routledge, 2004), Vol. 3, pp. 1–2.
 With L. Embree, ‘Introduction to Volume IV,’ Phenomenology. Critical Concepts in Philosophy. Ed. Dermot Moran and Lester E. Embree. (London & New York: Routledge, 2004), Vol. 4, pp. 1–2.
 With L. Embree, ‘Introduction to Volume V,’ Phenomenology. Critical Concepts in Philosophy. Ed. Dermot Moran and Lester E. Embree. (London & New York: Routledge, 2004), Vol. 5, pp. 1–3.
 “An Original Christian Platonism: Eriugena’s Response to the Tradition,” Bilan et Perspectives des études médiévales (1993–1998), Euroconférence (Barcelone, 8–12 juin 1999), Actes du IIe Congrès Européen d’Études Médiévales, ed. J. Hamesse. (Turnhout: Brepols, 2004), pp. 467–487.
 “Neoplatonic and Negative Theological Elements in Anselm’s Argument for the Existence of God in Proslogion,” in Pensées de l’un dans l’histoire de la philosophie. Études en hommage au Professor Werner Beierwaltes, edité par Jean-Marc Narbonne et Alfons Reckermann, Collection Zêtêsis (Paris/Montréal: Vrin/Presses de l’Université Laval, 2004), pp. 198–229.
 “Eriugena, John Scottus,” Dictionary Entry, in Tom Duddy, ed., Dictionary of Irish Philosophers (Bristol: Thoemmes Continuum Press, 2004), pp. 119–126.
 “The Problem of Empathy: Lipps, Scheler, Husserl and Stein,” in Amor Amicitiae: On the Love that is Friendship. Essays in Medieval Thought and Beyond in Honor of the Rev. Professor James McEvoy, ed. Thomas A. Kelly and Phillip W. Rosemann (Leuven/Paris/ Dudley, MA: Peeters, 2004), pp. 269–312.
 “Making Sense: Husserl’s Phenomenology as Transcendental Idealism,” in J. Malpas, ed., From Kant to Davidson: Philosophy and the Idea of the Transcendental, Routledge Studies in Twentieth-Century Philosophy. (London: Routledge, 2003), pp. 48–74. Reprinted in Phenomenology. Critical Concepts in Philosophy. Ed. Dermot Moran and Lester E. Embree (London & New York: Routledge, 2004), Vol. 1, pp. 84–113.
 “John Scottus Eriugena,” Encyclopedia Entry, The Stanford Encyclopedia of Philosophy. (Fall 2003 Edition), ed. Edward N. Zalta. Internet encyclopaedia
 “Medieval Philosophy from St. Augustine to Nicholas of Cusa,” in John Shand, ed., The Fundamentals of Philosophy (London and NY: Routledge, 2003), pp. 155–203.
 “Time and Eternity in the Periphyseon,” History and Eschatology in John Scottus Eriugena and His Time. Proceedings of the Tenth International Conference of the Society for the Promotion of Eriugena Studies, Maynooth and Dublin, 16–20 August 2000, ed. James McEvoy and Michael Dunne (Leuven: Leuven University Press, 2002), pp. 487–507.
 “Editor’s Introduction,” in D. Moran and T. Mooney, eds, The Phenomenology Reader (London & New York: Routledge, 2002), pp. 1–26.
 “Introduction,” in E. Husserl, Logical Investigations, trans. J. N. Findlay (London and New York: Routledge, 2001), Vol. 1, pp. xxi – lxxii.
 “Introduction,” in E. Husserl, The Shorter Logical Investigations. Trans. J. N. Findlay. Edited and abridged with new Introduction by Dermot Moran and new Preface by Michael Dummett (London & New York: Routledge, 2001), pp. xxv – lxxxi.
 “Analytic Philosophy and Phenomenology,” The Reach of Reflection: Issues for Phenomenology's Second Century, Proceedings of Center for Advanced Research in Phenomenology Symposium, Florida Atlantic University, 2001. Ed. Lester Embree, Samuel J. Julian, and Steve Crowell. 3 Vols. (West Harford: Electron Press, 2001), Vol. 3, pp. 409–433.
 “Husserl and the Crisis of European Science,” in T. Crane, M. W. F. Stone and J. Wolff, eds, The Proper Ambition of Science (London: Routledge, 2000), pp. 122–150.
 “Heidegger’s Critique of Husserl’s and Brentano’s Accounts of Intentionality,” Inquiry Vol. 43 No. 1 (March 2000), pp. 39–65; reprinted in Phenomenology. Critical Concepts in Philosophy. Ed. Dermot Moran and Lester E. Embree. (London & New York: Routledge, 2004), Vol. 1, pp. 157–183.
 »Johannes Eriugena. Der christliche Neuplatonismus der Natur« in Philosophen des Mittelalters, hrsg. Theo Kobusch (Darmstadt: Wissenschaftliche Buchgesellschaft,2000), pp. 13–26.
 “Eriugena, Johannes Scottus (c. 800-c. 877),” The Concise Routledge Encyclopedia of Philosophy. Ed. Edward Craig (London: Routledge, 2000), pp. 252–253.
 “Platonism, Medieval,” The Concise Routledge Encyclopedia of Philosophy. Ed. Edward Craig (London: Routledge, 2000), pp. 680–681.
 “Eriugena, Johannes Scottus (c. 800-c. 877),” The Routledge Encyclopedia of Philosophy. Ed. Edward Craig (London: Routledge, 1998), Vol. 3, pp. 401–406.
 “Platonism, Medieval,” The Routledge Encyclopedia of Philosophy. Ed. Edward Craig (London: Routledge, 1998), Vol. 7, pp. 431–439.
 “The Analytic and Continental Divide: Teaching Philosophy in an Age of Pluralism,” in Teaching Philosophy on the Eve of the Twenty-First Century, ed. D. Evans and I. Kuçuradi (Ankara: International Federation of Philosophical Societies, 1998), pp. 119–154.
 “Towards a Philosophy of the Environment,” in John Feehan, ed., Educating for Environmental Awareness, (Dublin: University College Dublin Environmental Institute, 1997), pp. 45–67.
 “A Case for Pluralism: The Problem of Intentionality,” in Philosophy. Royal Institute of Philosophy Supplementary Volume. Edited by David Archard. (Cambridge: Cambridge University Press, 1996), pp. 19 – 32.
 “Eriugena’s Theory of Language in the Periphyseon: Explorations in the Neoplatonic Tradition,” in Próinséas Ní Chatháin and Michael Richter, eds., Ireland and Europe in the Early Middle Ages IV. Language and Learning (Frankfurt: Klett-Cotta, 1996), pp. 240–260.
 “The Contemporary Significance of Meister Eckhart’s Teaching,” in Ursula Fleming, ed., Meister Eckhart: The Man From Whom God Hid Nothing (Leominster: Gracewing, 1995), pp. 131–42.
 Medieval Philosophy. Philosophy Foundation Module Textbook for Oscail. (Dublin: DCU, 1994).
 Phenomenology, Hermeneutics, Deconstruction. Philosophy Contemporary Philosophy Module Textbook for Oscail. (Dublin: Dublin City University Publications, 1994). 200 pp.
 “The Destruction of the Destruction: Heidegger’s Versions of the History of Philosophy,” Paper Read to the Colloquium on 100th Anniversary of Heidegger's Birthday, Yale University, 13–15 Oct 1989, Proceedings, ed. K. Harries & C. Jamme, Martin Heidegger: Politics, Art, and Technology (New York: Holmes & Meier, 1994), pp. 175–196.
 Reading Kant. The Critique of Pure Reason (co-authored with James O'Shea). Philosophy 2. Reading Philosophers Textbook for University Distance Learning Degree in Humanities. Oscail, Dublin: Dublin City University Publications, 1995. nine chapters on Kant, approx. 150 pp.
 “Origen and Eriugena: Aspects of Christian Gnosis,” Paper presented to the First Patristics Symposium, Maynooth College, June 1990. Proceedings published as The Relationship between Neoplatonism and Christianity, ed. T. Finan and V. Twomey (Dublin: Four Courts Press), 1992, pp. 27–53.
 “Time, Space and Matter in John Scottus Eriugena: An Examination of Eriugena’s Account of the Physical World,” Paper Read to the Royal Irish Academy, May 1989, published in At The Heart of the Real. Essays in Honour of Archbishop Desmond Connell, ed. F. O’Rourke (Dublin: Irish Academic Press, 1992), pp. 67– 96.
 »Die Destruktion der Destruktion. Heideggers Versionen der Geschichte der Philosophie«, in C. Jamme & K. Harries, herausgegebenen, Kunst – Politik – Technik. Martin Heidegger (München: Wilhelm Fink Verlag, 1991), pp. 295–318.
 “Officina omnium or notio quaedam intellectualis in mente divina aeternaliter facta. The Problem of the Definition of Man in John Scottus Eriugena,” paper read to the Seventh International Conference of the Société International pour l'Etude de la Philosophie Médiévale, Louvain, Septembre, 1982. Published in L’Homme et son univers au moyen âge, ed. C. Wenin, 2 Vols. (Louvain, 1986). Vol. 1, pp. 195–204.
 “Nature, Man and God in the Philosophy of John Scottus Eriugena,” in R. Kearney, ed., The Irish Mind (Dublin and New Jersey: Wolfhound Press and Humanities Press, 1985), pp. 91–106; pp. 324–332.
 “Wandering from the Path. The Navigatio Theme in Johannes Scottus Eriugena,” in Richard Kearney and Patrick Hederman, eds, The Crane Bag Book of Irish Studies v. 1 (Dublin: Blackwater/Folens, 1982), pp. 244–250.
 “Johannes Scottus Eriugena,” Art About Ireland (Dublin, 1983), Vol. 1 No. 4, pp. 25–29

Translations 
 “Edmund Husserl’s Letter to Lucien Lévy-Bruhl, 11 March 1935,” Translation from the German, with Lukas Steinacher, New Yearbook for Phenomenology and Phenomenological Philosophy, Vol. VIII (2008), pp. 349–354.
 Jean Pépin, “St. Augustine on The Indwelling of the Ideas in God,” in Stephen Gersh and Dermot Moran, eds, Eriugena, Berkeley and the Idealist Tradition (Notre Dame, Indiana: University of Notre Dame Press, 2006), pp. 105–122. Trans. from the French by D. Moran and S. Gersh.
 Jean Greisch, “Heidegger on Eschatology and the God of Time,” International Journal of Philosophical Studies Vol 4. No 1 March 1996), pp. 17–42, Trans. from the French by D. Moran.
 Jacques Taminiaux, “Bios Politikos and Bios Theoretikos in the Phenomenology of Hannah Arendt,” International Journal of Philosophical Studies Vol. 4, No 2 (September 1996), pp. 215–232. Trans. from the French by D. Moran.

Critical notices 
 “Ethics and Selfhood: A Critique”. Critical Notice of James Richard Mensch, Ethics and Selfhood. Alterity and the Phenomenology of Obligation (Albany, NY: SUNY Pr., 2003),’ in International Journal of Philosophical Studies, Vol. 11. No 1 (Feb. 2006), pp. 95–107.
 ‘Adventures of the Reduction: Jacques Taminiaux, The Metamorphoses of Phenomenological Reduction,’ critical notice of Jacques Taminiaux, The Metamorphoses of Phenomenological Reduction, The Aquinas Lecture 2004 (Marquette U. P., 2004), in American Catholic Philosophical Quarterly, Vol. 80, no. 2 (spring 2006), pp. 283–293.
 Review of Alfredo Ferrarin, Hegel and Aristotle (Cambridge U. P., 2001), Bulletin of the Hegel Society of Great Britain Nos. 51/52 (2005), pp. 120–126.
 Review of Steve Galt Crowell, Husserl, Heidegger, and the Space of Meaning. Paths Toward Transcendental Phenomenology, in European Journal of Philosophy, Vol. 12 No. 3 (2004), pp. 414–420.
 Review of Daniel C. Dennett, Kinds of Minds (Basic Books, 1996) in Mind Vol. 109 No. 436 (Oct. 2000), pp. 883 – 890.
 “New Books on Merleau-Ponty,” International Journal of Philosophical Studies Vol. 7 No. 3 (October 1999), pp. 393–402.
 “Expounding Eriugena,” Irish Historical Studies, Vol. XXXI No. 122 (November 1998), pp. 247–258.
 “Phenomenology and the Philosophy of Mathematics: Husserl and Realism in Mathematics,” Philosophical Studies Vol. XXXI (Dublin, 1986). pp. 361 – 365.

Book reviews 
 Review of David R. Cerbone, Understanding Phenomenology (Acumen, 2006), in Notre Dame Philosophical Reviews (2007.01.08), http://ndpr.nd.edu/review.cfm?id=8484.
 Review of Lester Embree et al., eds, The Encyclopedia of Phenomenology (Kluwer, 1997), in Intentional Journal of Philosophical Studies, Vol. 13 No 1 (Feb 2005), pp. 134–36.
 Review of William Hamrick, Kindness and the Good Society, Connections of the Heart (Albany, NY: SUNY Pr., 2002) in International Journal of Philosophical Studies, forthcoming.
 Review of Thomas Duddy, A History of Irish Thought (Routledge, 2002) in Notre Dame Philosophical Reviews (2003.01.09) http://ndpr.icaap.org/content/archives/2003/1/moranduddy.html
 Review of R. Small, ed. A Hundred Years of Phenomenology: Perspectives On a Philosophical Tradition (Ashgate, 2001), in Journal of the History of Philosophy, Vol. 41 No. 3 (July 2003), pp. 422–423.
 Review of Cyril O’Regan, Gnostic Return in Modernity and Gnostic Apocalypse. Jacob Boehme's Haunted Narrative (State University of New York Press, 2002), in Notre Dame Philosophical Reviews, 1 May 2002, pp. 1–6. http://ndpr.icaap.org/content/archives/2002/5/moranoregan.html
 Review of Robert Sokolowski, Introduction to Phenomenology (Cambridge U. P., 2000), in Journal of the British Society for Phenomenology Vol. 32 No. 1 (January 2001), pp. 109 – 112.
 Review of Michael Herren, ed., Iohannis Scotti Eriugenae Carmina (Dublin: Institute for Advanced Studies, 1993) in Peritia, ed. D. Ó Cróinín Vol. 12 (1998), pp. 400 – 403.
 Review of Michael Herren, ed., Iohannis Scotti Eriugenae Carmina (Dublin: Institute for Advanced Studies, 1993) in Irish Theological Quarterly Vol. 64 No. 3 (Autumn 1999), pp. 321 – 323.
 Review of R. S. Woolhouse, Descartes, Spinoza, Leibniz. The Concept of Substance in Seventeenth-Century Philosophy, in the British Journal for the History of Philosophy. Vol. 6 No. 3(October 1998), pp. 482–486.
 Review of William Lyons, Approaches to Intentionality, International Journal of Philosophical Studies Vol. 5 No. 3 (October 1997), pp. 471–476.
 Review of Andrew Benjamin, The Plural Event. Descartes, Hegel, Heidegger in Bulletin of the Hegel Society of Great Britain. No. 34 (Autumn/Winter 1996), pp. 53–59.
 Review of Willemien Otten, The Anthropology of Johannes Scottus Eriugena, in Speculum. A Journal of Medieval Studies Vol. 69 No. 2 (April 1994), pp. 543–545.
 Review of J. J. O’Meara, Eriugena in The Review of Metaphysics (Sept. 1990), pp. 156–157.
 Review of J.J. O’Meara, ed., Eriugena. Periphyseon (On the Division of Nature) in Speculum. A Journal of Medieval Studies Vol. 65 No. 1 (Jan. 1990), pp. 180–181.
 Review of J. Dillon and G. Morrow, trans., Proclus’ Commentary on Plato's Parmenides (1987)in The Irish Philosophical Journal Vol. 6 No. 1 (Belfast, 1989), pp. 164–166.
 Review of Richard Kearney, The Wake of Imagination in Irish Philosophical Journal Vol. 6 No. 2 (1989), pp. 311 – 314.
 Review of Analecta Husserliana Vol. XVII (1984), Phenomenology of Life in a Dialogue Between Chinese and Occidental Philosophy, in Journal of the British Society for Phenomenology Vol. 18 No.1 (1987), pp. 90 – 92.
 Review of Richard Kearney, Modern Movement in European Philosophy, in The Furrow Vol.XXXVIII No. 7 (July 1987), pp. 478 – 479.
 Review of R.S. Cohen, M. Martin, and M. Westphal, eds, Studies on the Philosophy of J.N. Findlay in Journal of the British Society for Phenomenology Vol. 17 No. 2 (May 1986), pp. 200–201.
 Review of P. Connerton, The Tragedy of Enlightenment, in Philosophical Studies (Dublin) Vol.XXXI (1986), pp. 460–464.
 “The Poets of Munster,” The Irish Literary Supplement (Spring, 1986), p. 20.
 Review of Richard Kearney, Poétique du possible. Phénoménologie Herméneutique de la Figuration in Philosophical Studies Vol. XXX1 (Dublin, 1986) pp. 555–557.
 Review of R. Kearney, Dialogues with Contemporary Continental Thinkers, in Journal of the British Society for Phenomenology Vol. 16 No. 3 (Oct. 1985), pp. 307–310.
 “The Protestant Consciousness. The Field Day Pamphlets,” The Irish Literary Supplement(Fall, 1985), pp. 1, 24. Review of Merold Westphal, History and Truth in Hegel's Phenomenology, in Bulletin of the Hegel Society of Great Britain No. 11 (Spring/Summer 1985), pp. 21–24.
 Review of Analecta Husserliana, Vol. XIV (1983), The Phenomenology of Man and the Human Condition, in Journal of the British Society for Phenomenology Vol. 15 No. 3 (Oct. 1984), pp. 314–317.
 Review of Q. Lauer, Hegel's Philosophy of God, in Bulletin of the Hegel Society of Great Britain No. 9 (Spring/Summer 1984), pp. 33–36.
 Review of E. Brian Titley, Church, State and the Control of Schooling in Ireland (Gill & Macmillan), The Irish Press, 14 January 1984, p. 9.
 Review of Nathan Scott, Mirrors of Man in Existentialism, Hibernia National Review 3 May 1979.
 Review of John Maguire, Marx's Theory of Politics, Hibernia National Review, 1 March 1979
 Review of Agnes Heller, Renaissance Man, Hibernia National Review 19 April 1979

Other miscellaneous publications 
 Proceedings of the Thirty-Fifth Annual Meeting of the Husserl Circle, University College Dublin, 9–12 June 2005, ed. Dermot Moran (Dublin: University College Dublin, 2005).
 “What Kind of Being is the Foetus?” Irish Times 1.4.1992
 “An Chritic Liteartha: Fadhb na Léitheoireacta,” Comhar (Nollaig 1984), pp. 28–31.
 “Nationalism, Religion and the Education Question,” The Crane Bag Vol. 7 No. 2 (1983), pp. 77–84.
 “Teaching Literature in Ireland Today,” The Crane Bag Vol. 6 No. 2 (1982), pp. 133–135.

References

External links
 Dermot Moran's personal webpage at University College Dublin
 The webpage of the IRCHSS-funded research project 'The phenomenology of Consciousness and Subjectivity', Principal Investigator Professor Dermot Moran
 https://www.springer.com/series/5811
 http://www.tandf.co.uk/journals/routledge/09672559.html
 http://www.fisp.org/index.html Fédération

Living people
20th-century Irish philosophers
21st-century Irish philosophers
Phenomenologists
Alumni of University College Dublin
Yale University alumni
Rice University faculty
State University of New York faculty
Academic staff of the Université catholique de Louvain
Academic staff of the University of Paris
Academics of Queen's University Belfast
Philosophers of mind
Year of birth missing (living people)
People educated at Oatlands College
Christian continental philosophers and theologians
Analytic theologians